The 2019 season was the Detroit Lions' 90th in the National Football League (NFL) and their second year under head coach Matt Patricia. The Lions had a promising start to the season with a 2–0–1 record. However, they lost 12 of their last 13 games and were mathematically eliminated from postseason contention following a Thanksgiving Day loss to the Chicago Bears in week 13. After franchise QB Matthew Stafford broke his backbone in a Week 9 loss to the Oakland Raiders, the Lions were forced to turn to former Bengals backup QB Jeff Driskel and later undrafted free agent David Blough, neither of whom was able to lead the Lions to a single win. The Lions failed to improve on their 6–10 record from last season, finishing the season with a 3–12–1 record and nine consecutive losses. This resulted in the 3rd pick of the 2020 NFL Draft. They also posted consecutive losing seasons for the first time since 2012–2013. Not only that, they also got swept by their division rivals for the first time since 2012.

Offseason

Coaching changes
On January 1, the Lions announced that Jim Bob Cooter would not return as offensive coordinator.
On January 16, the Lions hired Darrell Bevell as offensive coordinator.
On January 22, the Lions hired John Bonamego as special teams coordinator.
On February 26, the Lions hired Kyle Caskey as running backs coach.
On March 11, the Lions hired Stephen Thomas as defensive quality control coach, Rodney Hill as assistant strength and performance coach, Leon Washington as WCF minority coaching assistantship/offense and special teams coach, and Marquice Williams as assistant special teams coach.

Additions

Departures

Re-signings

Trades
On June 13, the Lions originally traded tight end Michael Roberts to the New England Patriots in exchange for a conditional seventh-round pick in the 2020 NFL Draft. The trade was rescinded the next day, and Roberts was subsequently released by the Lions.
On October 22, the Lions traded safety Quandre Diggs and a seventh-round pick in the 2021 NFL Draft to the Seattle Seahawks for a  fifth-round pick in the 2020 NFL Draft.

NFL Draft

Draft trades
The Lions acquired a fourth-round selection (No. 114) from the New England Patriots in the 2018 draft in exchange for a third-round selection in the 2019 draft.
The Lions received a third round selection from the Philadelphia Eagles in exchange for wide receiver Golden Tate.
The Lions acquired a third-round selection (No. 81) from the Minnesota Vikings in exchange for their original third-round selection (No. 88) and a sixth-round selection (No. 204).
The Lions acquired a fourth-round selection (No. 117) and a sixth-round selection (No. 186) from the Atlanta Falcons in exchange for their original fourth-round selection (No. 111).
The Miami Dolphins traded a conditional seventh-round selection to Detroit in exchange for defensive tackle Akeem Spence.
Detroit traded a fifth-round selection to the New York Giants in exchange for defensive tackle Damon Harrison. The condition was that the Giants would receive the higher of Detroit or San Francisco's 5th round selections.
The San Francisco 49ers traded their fifth-round selection to Detroit in exchange for guard Laken Tomlinson.

Staff

Final roster

Preseason

Regular season

Schedule

Note: Intra-division opponents are in bold text.

Game summaries

Week 1: at Arizona Cardinals

The Lions began the regular season on the road against the Arizona Cardinals. After a scoreless first quarter, the Lions took a big lead by scoring 17 points in the second quarter via a 55-yard field goal by Matt Prater, a 47-yard touchdown pass from Matthew Stafford to Danny Amendola and a nine-yard touchdown pass from Stafford to Kenny Golladay. Arizona responded with a 20-yard field goal by Zane Gonzalez to make the score 17–3 in favor of Detroit at half-time. Arizona scored the only points of the third quarter via a 42-yard field goal by Gonzalez. Detroit extended their lead in the fourth quarter via a 23-yard touchdown pass from Stafford to T. J. Hockenson. The Cardinals responded with 18 points in the fourth quarter, via a 34-yard field goal by Gonzalez, a 27-yard touchdown pass from Kyler Murray to David Johnson, and a four-yard touchdown pass from Murray to Larry Fitzgerald, followed by a two-point conversion pass from Murray to Christian Kirk to tie the game and force overtime. In overtime, the Cardinals scored via a 28-yard field goal by Gonzalez, and the Lions scored via a 33-yard field goal by Prater to re-tie the score before time expired. This was the first tie by the Lions since 1984 against Philadelphia.

Week 2: vs. Los Angeles Chargers

In week 2, the Lions began their home schedule against the Los Angeles Chargers. The Chargers took an early lead in the first quarter via a one-yard touchdown run from Austin Ekeler. The Lions responded with a 36-yard touchdown pass from Matthew Stafford to Kerryon Johnson, and after a failed extra point conversion, the Lions trailed by a point. The Chargers extended their lead in the second quarter via a 39-yard field goal by Ty Long, making the score 10–6 in favor of Los Angeles at half-time. After a scoreless third quarter, Detroit scored the only points of the second half via a 31-yard touchdown pass from Stafford to Kenny Golladay to take a 13–10 lead. The Chargers' attempted comeback failed when a Philip Rivers pass was intercepted by Darius Slay in the end zone with 1:03 to play in the game, giving the Lions their first win of the season.

Week 3: at Philadelphia Eagles

In week 3, the Lions visited the Philadelphia Eagles. The Eagles opened the scoring in the first quarter via a 25-yard field goal by Jake Elliott. The Lions then took the lead when Jamal Agnew returned a kickoff 100 yards for a touchdown, but Philadelphia responded with a one-yard touchdown run from Jordan Howard to take it back. The Lions added 13 points in the second quarter via a one-yard touchdown run from Kerryon Johnson and a pair of field goals by Matt Prater, from 25 and 33 yards, respectively, making the score 20–10 in favor of Detroit at half-time. The Eagles scored the only points of the third quarter via a 20-yard touchdown pass from Carson Wentz to Nelson Agholor. The Lions extended their lead in the fourth quarter via a 12-yard touchdown pass from Matthew Stafford to Marvin Jones. The Eagles responded with a two-yard touchdown pass from Wentz to Agholor, making the final score 27–24 in favor of Detroit.

Week 4: vs. Kansas City Chiefs

In week 4, the Lions hosted the Kansas City Chiefs. The Lions opened the scoring in the first quarter via a 25-yard field goal by Matt Prater, before extending their lead through a five-yard touchdown pass from Matthew Stafford to T. J. Hockenson. The Chiefs scored 13 points in the second quarter via a pair of field goals by Harrison Butker from 23 yards and 44 yards, respectively, and a one-yard touchdown run from LeSean McCoy. The Lions scored via a 48-yard field goal by Prater, tying the score at 13–13 at halftime. The Chiefs took their first lead of the game in the third quarter via a 100-yard fumble recovery by Bashaud Breeland. The Lions responded with 10 points via a 53-yard field goal by Prater and a nine-yard touchdown pass from Stafford to Kenny Golladay to regain the lead. The teams exchanged touchdowns in the fourth quarter via a one-yard touchdown run from Darrel Williams for the Chiefs and a six-yard touchdown pass from Stafford to Golladay for the Lions. The Chiefs scored the game's final points via a one-yard touchdown run from Williams, making the final score 34–30 in favor of Kansas City, and giving the Lions their first loss of the season, going into their bye week with a 2–1–1 record. The Lions also failed to start the season with 3 wins for the first time since 2011.

Week 6: at Green Bay Packers

After their bye week, for week 6, the Lions visited their divisional rival, the Green Bay Packers, on Monday Night Football. The Lions scored 10 points in the first quarter via a 26-yard field goal by Matt Prater and a one-yard touchdown run from Kerryon Johnson, and extended their lead in the second quarter via a 22-yard field goal by Prater. The Packers responded with 10 points via a five-yard touchdown pass from Aaron Rodgers to Jamaal Williams and a 37-yard field goal by Mason Crosby, making the score 13–10 in favor of Detroit at half-time. The Packers opened the scoring in the third quarter via a 48-yard field goal by Crosby to tie the game. The Lions responded with two field goals by Prater, from 41 and 51 yards to regain the lead. The Lions extended their lead in the fourth quarter via a 54-yard field goal by Prater. The Packers responded with 10 points via a 35-yard touchdown pass from Rodgers to Allen Lazard, and a 23-yard field goal by Crosby as time expired, making the final score 23–22 in favor of Green Bay.

Week 7: vs. Minnesota Vikings

In week 7, the Lions hosted another divisional rival, the Minnesota Vikings. The Lions scored 14 points in the first quarter via two touchdown passes from Matthew Stafford to Marvin Jones from 16-yards, and three-yards, respectively. The Vikings responded with a 25-yard touchdown pass from Kirk Cousins to Adam Thielen. The Vikings scored 14 points in the second quarter via a one-yard touchdown pass from Cousins to Bisi Johnson and an eight-yard touchdown run from Dalvin Cook to take their first lead of the game. The Lions responded with a 10-yard touchdown pass from Stafford to Jones, tying the score at 21–21 at halftime. Minnesota regained the lead in the third quarter via a five-yard touchdown pass from Cousins to C. J. Ham. The Lions responded with a 46-yard field goal by Matt Prater. The Vikings scored 14 points in the fourth quarter via a 15-yard touchdown pass from Cousins to Kyle Rudolph and a four-yard touchdown run from Cook. The Lions responded with a two-yard touchdown pass from Stafford to Jones, making the final score 42–30 in favor of Minnesota, for Detroit's third consecutive loss. Jones became the first Lions player with four touchdown receptions in a game since Cloyce Box did so against the Baltimore Colts in 1950. Stafford became the fastest quarterback to throw for 40,000 yards, reaching the milestone in 147 games.

Week 8: vs. New York Giants

In week 8, the Lions hosted the New York Giants. The Lions scored 14 points in the first quarter via a 13-yard fumble return by Devon Kennard and a 49-yard touchdown pass from Matthew Stafford to Marvin Hall. The Giants added 13 points in the second quarter via two touchdown passes from Daniel Jones to Darius Slayton, from 22-yards, and 28-yards, respectively. The Lions responded with a 52-yard field goal by Matt Prater, making the score 17–13 in favor of Detroit at half-time. The teams exchanged touchdowns in the third quarter via a nine-yard touchdown pass from Stafford to Kenny Golladay for Detroit and a two-yard touchdown pass from Jones to Evan Engram for New York. The teams exchanged touchdowns in the fourth quarter via a 41-yard touchdown pass from Stafford to Golladay for Detroit and a four-yard touchdown pass from Jones to Saquon Barkley for New York, making the final score 31–26 in favor of Detroit, snapping their three-game losing streak.

Week 9: at Oakland Raiders

In week 9, the Lions visited the Oakland Raiders. The teams exchanged touchdowns in the first quarter via a two-yard touchdown run from Josh Jacobs for the Raiders and a two-yard touchdown pass from Matthew Stafford to Marvin Jones for the Lions. The Raiders regained the lead in the second quarter via a 32-yard field goal by Daniel Carlson. The Lions responded with a 59-yard touchdown pass from Stafford to Kenny Golladay to take their first lead of the game. The Raiders responded with a three-yard touchdown run from Jacobs, making the score 17–14 in favor of Oakland at half-time. The Lions scored the only points of the third quarter via a 23-yard field goal by Matt Prater to tie the game. The teams exchanged touchdowns in the fourth quarter via a three-yard touchdown pass from Derek Carr to Foster Moreau for the Raiders and a 26-yard touchdown pass from Stafford to J. D. McKissic for the Lions. The Raiders scored the final points of the game via a nine-yard touchdown pass from Carr to Hunter Renfrow, making the final score 31–24 in favor of Oakland. The Lions' attempt to tie the game fell short when they moved the ball to the Oakland 1-yard line with eight seconds on the clock, but were unable to score on the final play of the game.

Week 10: at Chicago Bears

In week 10, the Lions visited their divisional rival, the Chicago Bears. The Lions opened the scoring in the first quarter via a 23-yard field goal by Matt Prater and extended their lead in the second quarter via a 54-yard field goal by Prater. The Bears responded with an 18-yard touchdown pass from Mitchell Trubisky to Ben Braunecker, making the score 7–6 in favor of Chicago at half-time. The Bears added 13 points in the third quarter via a 9-yard touchdown pass from Trubisky to Tarik Cohen and a 24-yard touchdown pass from Trubisky to Taylor Gabriel. The Lions scored the only points of the fourth quarter via a 47-yard touchdown pass from Jeff Driskel to Kenny Golladay, making the final score 20–13 in favor of Chicago. Due to a back injury the previous week, this was the first regular season game Matthew Stafford missed since the 2010 season, ending his streak of 136 consecutive games played.

Week 11: vs. Dallas Cowboys

In week 11, the Lions hosted the Dallas Cowboys wearing white jerseys at a home game for the first time since 1970. The Lions opened the scoring in the first quarter via a five-yard touchdown run from Bo Scarbrough. The Cowboys responded with a 30-yard field goal by Brett Maher. The teams exchanged touchdowns in the second quarter via a 21-yard touchdown pass from Dak Prescott to Tony Pollard for the Cowboys to take their first lead of the game. The Lions responded with a two-yard touchdown run from Jeff Driskel to regain the lead. The Cowboys added 10 points via a one-yard touchdown run from Ezekiel Elliott, and a 19-yard touchdown pass from Prescott to Randall Cobb, making the score 24–14 in favor of Dallas at half-time. In the third quarter the Lions scored via an 11-yard touchdown pass from Driskel to Marvin Jones. The Cowboys responded with a 34-yard field goal by Maher. The teams exchanged touchdowns in the fourth quarter via a 17-yard touchdown pass from Prescott to Elliott, followed by a two-point conversion run from Pollard. The Lions scored the final points of the game via a 25-yard touchdown pass from Driskel to Jones, followed by a failed two-point conversion pass, making the final score 35–27 in favor of Dallas.

Week 12: at Washington Redskins

In week 12, the Lions visited the Washington Redskins. The Redskins opened the scoring in the first quarter via a 28-yard field goal by Dustin Hopkins. In the second quarter, the Lions responded with a 24-yard field goal by Matt Prater to tie the game. Washington responded with 10 points via a 91-yard kickoff return by Steven Sims and a 37-yard field goal by Hopkins to regain the lead. The Lions added a 49-yard field goal by Prater at the end of the first half, making the score 13–6 in favor of Washington at half-time. The Lions scored the only points of the third quarter via a 12-yard touchdown pass from Jeff Driskel to Logan Thomas to tie the game. In the fourth quarter the Lions scored via a 21-yard field goal by Prater, to take their first and only lead of the game. The Redskins responded with two field goals by Hopkins, from 42-yards, and 39-yards, respectively, making the final score 19–16 in favor of Washington, for Detroit's fourth consecutive loss.

Week 13: vs. Chicago Bears

In week 13, the Lions hosted a rematch with their divisional rival, the Chicago Bears, in their annual Thanksgiving Day game. The Bears opened the scoring in the first quarter via a 10-yard touchdown pass from Mitchell Trubisky to  Allen Robinson. The Lions responded with 14 points when third-string quarterback David Blough, in his NFL debut, threw two touchdown passes, one from 75-yards out to Kenny Golladay and one from eight-yards out to Marvin Jones. Both teams kicked field goals in the second quarter, first Detroit's Matt Prater from 25-yards, then Chicago's Eddy Pineiro from 30-yards, making the score 17–10 in favor of Detroit at half-time. The Bears scored the only points of the third quarter via an 18-yard touchdown pass from Trubisky to Jesper Horsted to tie the game at 17 points each. In the fourth quarter, the Lions responded with a 24-yard field goal by Prater to regain the lead. The Bears took their first lead of the game via a three-yard touchdown pass from Trubisky to David Montgomery. Detroit's attempted comeback failed when Robinson intercepted a pass from Blough in the final seconds, making the final score 24–20 in favor of Chicago, for Detroit's fifth consecutive loss. Also with the loss, the Lions would be eliminated from playoff contention.

Week 14: at Minnesota Vikings

In week 14, the Lions visited their divisional rival the Minnesota Vikings, for a rematch of week 7. The Vikings opened the scoring in the first quarter via a nine-yard touchdown pass from Kirk Cousins to Bisi Johnson. The Vikings added 10 points in the second quarter via a 27-yard field goal by Dan Bailey and a three-yard touchdown run from Dalvin Cook, making the score 17–0 in favor of Minnesota at half-time. After a scoreless third quarter, the Vikings extended their lead in the fourth quarter via a 50-yard field goal by Bailey. The Lions finally got on the board late in the fourth quarter via a 10-yard touchdown pass from David Blough to Kenny Golladay, making the final score 20–7 in favor of Minnesota, for Detroit's sixth consecutive loss.

Week 15: vs. Tampa Bay Buccaneers

In week 15, the Lions hosted the Tampa Bay Buccaneers. The Buccaneers scored 14 points in the first quarter via a 34-yard touchdown pass from Jameis Winston to Breshad Perriman and a 33-yard touchdown pass from Winston to Scott Miller. The Buccaneers extended their lead in the second quarter via a 25-yard touchdown pass from Winston to Perriman. The Lions finally got on the board via a 44-yard field goal by Matt Prater, making the score 21–3 in favor of Tampa Bay at half-time. In the third quarter the Buccaneers added a 46-yard field goal by Matt Gay. The Lions responded with a one-yard touchdown run from Wes Hills. In the fourth quarter the Lions added a one-yard touchdown run from Hills, reducing the Buccaneers lead to seven points. The Lions attempted comeback failed when David Blough's pass was intercepted by Sean Murphy-Bunting and returned 70-yards for a touchdown. The Buccaneers extended their lead via a 25-yard touchdown pass from Winston to Perriman, making the final score 38–17 in favor of Tampa Bay, for Detroit's seventh consecutive loss.

Week 16: at Denver Broncos

In week 16, the Lions visited the Denver Broncos. The Lions opened the scoring in the first quarter via a 26-yard field goal by Matt Prater. In the second quarter the Lions extended their lead via a 64-yard punt return by Jamal Agnew. The Broncos responded with 10 points via a one-yard touchdown run from Royce Freeman and a 34-yard field goal by Brandon McManus, tying the score at 10–10 at halftime. In the third quarter the Broncos took their first lead of the game via a 26-yard field goal by McManus. The Lions responded with a three-yard touchdown pass from David Blough to Kenny Golladay to regain the lead. The Broncos scored 14 points in the fourth quarter via a three-yard touchdown pass from Drew Lock to DaeSean Hamilton and a 27-yard touchdown run from Phillip Lindsay, making the final score 27–17 in favor of Denver, for Detroit's eighth consecutive loss.

Week 17: vs. Green Bay Packers
 
To end the season, the Lions hosted a rematch with their divisional rival, the Green Bay Packers. The Lions opened the scoring in the first quarter via a 19-yard pass from Danny Amendola to David Blough. The Lions extended their lead in the second quarter via a one-yard touchdown run from Kerryon Johnson. The Packers finally got on the board late in the first half via a 32-yard field goal by Mason Crosby. The Lions responded with a 42-yard field goal by Matt Prater as time expired, making the score 17–3 in favor of Detroit at half-time. The Packers scored the only points of the third quarter via a 20-yard touchdown pass from Aaron Rodgers to Davante Adams. The teams exchanged field goals in the fourth quarter via a 40-yard field goal by Crosby for the Packers, and a 56-yard field goal by Prater for the Lions. The Packers responded with 10 points via a 28-yard touchdown pass from Rodgers to Allen Lazard to tie the game, and a 33-yard field goal by Crosby as time expired, making the final score 23–20 in favor of Green Bay, for Detroit's ninth consecutive loss.

Standings

Division

Conference

References

External links

Detroit
Detroit Lions seasons
Detroit Lions